HippoDraw is a object-oriented statistical data analysis package written in C++, with user interaction via a Qt-based GUI and a Python-scriptable interface. It was developed by Paul Kunz at SLAC, primarily for the analysis and presentation of particle physics and astrophysics data, but can be equally well used in other fields where data handling is important.

HippoDraw can read and write files in an XML-based format, astrophysics FITS files, data objects produced by ROOT (optional), and through the Python bindings, anything that can be read/written by Python (HDF5, for instance, with PyTables).

HippoDraw can be used as a Python extension module, allowing users to use HippoDraw data objects with the full power of the Python language. This includes other scientific Python extension modules such Numeric and numarray, whose use with HippoDraw can lead to a large increase in processing speed, even for ROOT objects.

See also 

 Java Analysis Studio (JAS)
 ROOT
 AIDA

External links 
 
 License

Data analysis software
Free plotting software
Free science software
Free software programmed in C++
Free software projects
Free statistical software
Numerical software
Physics software
Science software for Linux
Science software for macOS
Science software for Windows
Science software that uses Qt